Glenn E. Warren (born July 26, 1943) is an American politician who served in the New York State Assembly from 1977 to 1994.

References

1943 births
Living people
Republican Party members of the New York State Assembly